Strathmore (D.J. Murray) Airport  is a registered aerodrome located  west northwest of Strathmore, Alberta, Canada.

See also
Strathmore (Appleton Field) Aerodrome

References

External links
Place to Fly on COPA's Places to Fly airport directory

Registered aerodromes in Alberta
Wheatland County, Alberta